The Ninth Circuit Court of Appeals, a federal court of the United States, struck down same-sex marriage bans in California, Idaho, and Nevada. Same-sex marriage bans were also struck down by district courts in Alaska, Arizona, and Oregon. The Ninth Circuit consists of Alaska, Arizona, California, Guam, Hawaii, Idaho, Montana, Nevada, the Northern Mariana Islands, Oregon and Washington. Same-sex marriage is currently legal in every state and territory within the circuit.

Hollingsworth v. Perry is the only case regarding the constitutionality of same-sex marriage bans to make its way to the Supreme Court from the Ninth Circuit. However, the Ninth Circuit's ruling in that case was vacated by the decision of the Supreme Court.

See also 
Jackson v. Abercrombie
Sevcik v. Sandoval
Latta v. Otter
Same-sex marriage
Same-sex marriage in the United States
Same-sex marriage in the Fourth Circuit
Same-sex marriage in the Seventh Circuit
Same-sex marriage in the Sixth Circuit
Same-sex marriage in the Tenth Circuit

References

United States Court of Appeals for the Ninth Circuit
9